Gordon Whyte may refer to:
 Gordon Whyte (cricketer)
 Gordon Whyte (Canadian football)

See also
 Gordon White (disambiguation)